Pseudopostega diskusi is a moth of the family Opostegidae. It is only known from the Cayo District of central Belize.

The length of the forewings is 2.8–3.1 mm. Adults are mostly white. Adults have been collected in April.

Etymology
This species is named in honor of Arunas Diškus, of Vilnius Pedagogical University, Vilnius, Lithuania, a specialist on moths of the superfamilies Nepticuloidea and Tischerioidea.

External links
A Revision of the New World Plant-Mining Moths of the Family Opostegidae (Lepidoptera: Nepticuloidea)

Opostegidae
Moths described in 2007